Events from the year 1999 in the British Virgin Islands.

Incumbents
Governor: Frank Savage
Chief Minister: Ralph T. O'Neal

May
 17 May 1999 - Chief Minister Ralph O'Neal leads the incumbent Virgin Islands Party to victory in the general election.

October
 21 October 1999 - Hurricane Jose strikes the British Virgin Islands.

November
 18 November 1999 - Hurricane Lenny strikes the British Virgin Islands.

Footnotes

 
1990s in the British Virgin Islands
British Virgin Islands